Tefft may refer to:

Tefft (surname)
Tefft, Indiana
Tefft-Steadman House